Bade Bhaiyya Ki Dulhania is an Indian Hindi comedy-drama television series, which aired on Sony TV and Sony TV Asia from 18 July 2016 to 7 October 2016.

Priyanshu Jora and Namita Dubey were the lead actors in the show.

Cast

Main
Priyanshu Jora as Abhishek Pant
Namita Dubey as Meera Raizada

Recurring
Ushma Rathod as Babli Pant, Abhishek's mother
Veena Mehta as Amma/Dadi, Abhishek's grandmother
Urfi Javed as Avni Pant, Abhishek's sister
Himanshu Dubgotra as Randheer
Yash Acharya as Rohan Pant, Abhishek's brother
Ritu Chaudhary Seth as Madhu Pant, Abhishek's aunt
Rishi Dev as Kapil Pant, Madhu's son
Charvi Saraf as Anita Pant, Madhu's daughter
Soniya Kaur as Rekha Pant, Abhishek's aunt
Arjun Manhas as Bhimraj a.k.a. Sona Pant, Rekha's son
Saloni Daini as Mona Pant, Rekha's daughter
Inderjeet Sagoo as Aman Singh, Meera's fiancé
Indraneel Bhattacharya as Prahlad Raizada, Meera's father
Palak Purswani as Rhea Raizada, Meera's sister
Naveen Pandita as Sanjay Thakral, Rhea's fiancé

References

External links

Hindi comedy shows
Hindi-language television shows
Indian comedy television series
2016 Indian television series debuts
Sony Entertainment Television original programming
2016 Indian television series endings